Asterolasia beckersii, commonly known as Dungowan starbush, is a species of erect shrub in the family Rutaceae and is endemic to a restricted area of New South Wales. It has woolly, star-shaped hairs on its branchlets, egg-shaped to lance-shaped leaves with the narrower end towards the base and covered with star-shaped hairs, and white flowers arranged singly in leaf axils, the back of the petals covered with star-like hairs.

Description
The upper surface of the leaves is sparsely hairy and the lower surface covered with greenish to fawnish, woolly, star-shaped hairs. Flowering has been observed in October.

Taxonomy
Asterolasia beckersii was first formally described in 2017 by Andrew Orme and Marco Duretto in the journal Telopea from specimens collected near Dungowan Dam near Tamworth in 2003. The specific epithet (beckersii) honours Doug Beckers for discovering the species.

Distribution and habitat
Dungowan starbush is only known from the type location where in grows in rocky soil along a creekbank.

Conservation status
This plant is listed as "endangered" under the New South Wales Government Biodiversity Conservation Act 2016 . The main threats to the species are its small population size and restricted distribution, road and track maintenance and weed invasion.

References

beckersii
Flora of New South Wales
Plants described in 2017
Taxa named by Marco Duretto